Friezland is a village in the civil parish of Saddleworth in the Metropolitan Borough of Oldham, in Greater Manchester, England. It is situated four miles east of the town of Oldham.

Historically a part of the West Riding of Yorkshire, Friezland lies between the village of Grasscroft and nearby town of Mossley. Friezland is situated on the banks of the Huddersfield Narrow Canal, and has a church, a church hall and a primary school. 
It is also the original home of Friezland Brass Band . The band has now set up a base in neighbouring village Uppermill, Saddleworth.

Friezland railway station was opened in 1886 by the LNWR on its loop line from Diggle to Stalybridge. The station itself was situated in what is, in the present day, outside of Friezland's boundaries and more closer to the centre of nearby Greenfield. It closed to passengers in 1917.

See also

Listed buildings in Saddleworth

External links

Map of Friezland area
Friezland Brass Band

Geography of the Metropolitan Borough of Oldham
Saddleworth
Villages in Greater Manchester